Lachiguirí may refer to:

San José Lachiguirí, Oaxaca
Santiago Lachiguiri, Oaxaca
Lachiguiri Zapotec language